= Abbott Rock =

Settlement in Canada

Coordinates: 46.844°N 55.803°W

Location of Abbott Rock in Newfoundland and Labrador

Abbott Rock is a settlement in Newfoundland and Labrador.
